Lily Arena Mito is an arena in Mito, Ibaraki, Japan. It is the home arena of the Cyberdyne Ibaraki Robots of the B.League, Japan's professional basketball league.

References

Basketball venues in Japan

Cyberdyne Ibaraki Robots
Indoor arenas in Japan

Sports venues in Ibaraki Prefecture